Veerapunayuni Palli is a village in YSR Kadapa district of the Indian state of Andhra Pradesh. It is located in Veerapunayunipalle mandal of Pulivendula revenue division.

References 

Villages in Kadapa district